The Sahu Jain family is an industrial family of India. They own Bennett, Coleman & Co. Ltd. (commonly known as The Times Group), which owns The Times of India, the most-circulated English-language newspaper in the world. The members of the extended family have interests in education (S P Jain School of Global Management), chemicals (DCW Ltd.) and finance (DoubleDot Ltd. and Crescent Finstock Ltd).

The family are from the Agrawal Jain community and has its origins in the small town of Najibabad, Bijnor district (near Meerut, Muzaffarnagar, 180 km from Delhi), present-day Uttar Pradesh, India.

Members
The leading members of the family have been Rai Bahadur Jagmundar Das Jain, Sahu Shanti Prasad Jain, Sahu Shreyans Prasad Jain, Ashok Kumar Jain, Sahu Ramesh Chandra Jain, Samir Jain, Vineet Jain, Sahu Deepak Jain and Indu Jain.

Jnanpith Awards, are given by the Bharatiya Jnanpith organization founded by the family. The group has also founded a few other awards that are coveted honours in the fields of fashion, movies and business in India - namely the Miss India title, Filmfare Awards (movies) and the Economic Times Awards for Corporate Excellence.

The Times Group has diversified into many fields. The Times of India (the world's largest circulated English-language newspaper), The Economic Times, FM Radio Mirchi, the biweekly magazine Femina India, the Indiatimes portal, the 24 hours English news channel Times Now, the Bollywood news and music channel Zoom are all owned by the Sahu Jain family.

See also
 Shah (Jain family name)
 Nattal Sahu

References

External links
 timesofindia.com
 Dalmia Brothers

The Times Group people
Jain families
Indian publishing families